Jo Woo-Jin (born 7 July 1987) is a South Korean footballer who has played as a midfielder for several South Korean football clubs, including Gwangju FC and Daegu FC.

Club career

Jo began his professional career in 2006 with Japanese club Sanfrecce Hiroshima, returning to Korea in 2008 after being released by his club following their relegation to the second tier of the J. League.  Jo then plied his trade in the Korea National League, initially with Ulsan Hyundai Mipo Dockyard and then Mokpo City FC. Jo was a priority pick from the 2011 K-League draft for Gwangju FC's roster in their foundation season in the K-League and made his return to senior level professional football as a substitute in Gwangju's 0 – 1 League Cup loss to Busan I'Park on 6 April 2011.

Club statistics

References

External links 

1987 births
Living people
Association football midfielders
South Korean footballers
J1 League players
K League 1 players
K League 2 players
Korea National League players
K3 League players
Sanfrecce Hiroshima players
Gwangju FC players
Daegu FC players
Cheonan City FC players
Hwaseong FC players
Ansan Greeners FC players
People from Andong